TRAF6 is a TRAF human protein.

Function 

The protein encoded by this gene is a member of the TNF receptor associated factor (TRAF) protein family. TRAF proteins are associated with, and mediate signal transduction from members of the TNF receptor superfamily. This protein mediates the signaling not only from the members of the TNF receptor superfamily, but also from the members of the Toll/IL-1 family. Signals from receptors such as CD40, TNFSF11/TRANCE/RANKL and IL-1 have been shown to be mediated by this protein. This protein also interacts with various protein kinases including IRAK1/IRAK, SRC and PKCzeta, which provides a link between distinct signaling pathways. This protein functions as a signal transducer in the NF-kappaB pathway that activates IkappaB kinase (IKK) in response to proinflammatory cytokines. The interaction of this protein with UBE2N/UBC13, and UBE2V1/UEV1A, which are ubiquitin conjugating enzymes catalyzing the formation of polyubiquitin chains, has been found to be required for IKK activation by this protein. Two alternatively spliced transcript variants encoding identical proteins have been reported.

Interactions 

TRAF6 has been shown to interact with:

 ASK1, 
 CD40, 
 FHL2, 
 HSPB2, 
 IKBKG, 
 IRAK1, 
 IRAK2, 
 TAB1, 
 MAP3K7IP2, 
 MAP3K7 
 PPP4C, 
 RANK, 
 SDCBP, 
 SIGIRR, 
 Sequestosome 1, 
 TAX1BP1, 
 TNFAIP3, 
 TNFRSF13B, 
 UBE2N,  and
 Ubiquitin C.

Model organisms
Model organisms have been used in the study of TRAF6 function. A conditional knockout mouse line called Traf6tm2a(EUCOMM)Wtsi was generated at the Wellcome Trust Sanger Institute. Male and female animals underwent a standardized phenotypic screen to determine the effects of deletion. Additional screens performed:  - In-depth immunological phenotyping

References

Further reading

External links